Wongabinda is a locality in the northwest of New South Wales, Australia, north-east of the town of Moree. The railway line to Boggabilla passes through, and a railway station existed between 1932 and 1975.

References 

Towns in New South Wales